Batyrovo (Batır) is a rural locality (a selo) in Mikhaylovsky Selsoviet, Fyodorovsky District, Bashkortostan, Russia. The population was 441 as of 2010. There are 8 streets.

Geography 
Batyrovo is located 43 km southeast of Fyodorovka (the district's administrative centre) by road. Mikhaylovka is the nearest rural locality.

References 

Rural localities in Fyodorovsky District